Octopus is the largest genus of octopuses, comprising more than 100 species. These species are widespread throughout the world's oceans. Many species formerly placed in the genus Octopus are now assigned to other genera within the family. The octopus has 8 arms, averaging 20 cm long for an adult.

Species

Octopus alatus Sasaki, 1920 (taxon inquirendum)
Octopus alecto Berry, 1953
Octopus araneoides * Iw. Taki, 1964 (taxon inquirendum)
Octopus arborescens Hoyle, 1904 (taxon inquirendum)
 Octopus argus Krauss, 1848
Octopus australis Hoyle, 1885 – hammer octopus
Octopus balboai Voss, 1971
 Octopus berenice Gray, 1849
Octopus berrima Stanks & Norman, 1992 – southern keeled octopus 
Octopus bimaculatus Verrill, 1883  – California two-spot octopus or Verrill's two-spot octopus
Octopus bimaculoides Pickford & McConnaughey, 1949 – California two-spot octopus 
Octopus bocki Adam, 1941 – Bock's pygmy octopus 
Octopus briareus Robson, 1929 – Caribbean reef octopus 
Octopus bulbus Norman, 2001
Octopus californicus Berry, 1911 – North Pacific bigeye octopus 
Octopus campbelli Smith, 1902
Octopus chierchiae Jatta, 1889 – lesser Pacific striped octopus
Octopus conispadiceus Sasaki, 1917 – chestnut octopus
Octopus cyanea Gray, 1849 – big blue octopus or Cyane's octopus, 
Octopus diminutus Kaneko & Kubodera, 2008
Octopus djinda Amor, 2021
Octopus favonius Gray, 1849
Octopus filamentosus Blainville, 1826 (taxon inquirendum)
 Octopus filosus Howell, 1867
Octopus fitchi Berry, 1953 – Fitch's pygmy octopus 
Octopus fujitai Sasaki, 1929 (taxon inquirendum)
Octopus gardineri Hoyle, 1905
Octopus globosus Appellöf, 1886 (taxon inquirendum) – globe octopus
Octopus gorgonus Huffard, 2007
Octopus harpedon Norman, 2001
Octopus hattai Sasaki, 1929
 Octopus hawaiiensis Eydoux & Souleyet, 1852
Octopus hongkongensis Hoyle, 1885 (taxon inquirendum)
Octopus hubbsorum Berry, 1953 – Hubb's octopus
Octopus humilis Huffard, 2007
Octopus hummelincki Adam, 1936 – bumblebee two-spot octopus or Caribbean two-spot octopus
 Octopus huttoni Benham, 1943
Octopus incella Kaneko & Kubodera, 2007
Octopus insularis Leite & Haimovici, 2008
Octopus jeraldi Pratt, Baldwin & Vecchione, 2020
Octopus joubini Robson, 1929 - Atlantic pygmy octopus or small-egg Caribbean pygmy octopus
Octopus kaharoa O'Shea, 1999
Octopus kaurna Stranks, 1990 – southern sand octopus
Octopus kermedecensis Berry, 1914
Octopus laqueus Kaneko & Kubodera, 2005
Octopus longispadiceus Sasaki, 1917 (taxon inquirendum)
Octopus mariles Huffard, 2007
Octopus maya Voss & Solís, 1966 – Mexican four-eyed octopus
Octopus mercatoris  Adam, 1937
Octopus mernoo O'Shea, 1999
Octopus microphthalmus Goodrich, 1896
Octopus micropyrsus Berry, 1953 – California Lilliput octopus
Octopus micros Norman, 2001
Octopus mimus Gould, 1852
Octopus minor Sasaki, 1920 (taxon inquirendum)
O. m. minor  Sasaki, 1920 · accepted, alternate representation
Octopus mutilans Taki, 1942
Octopus nanhaiensis Dong, 1976 (taxon inquirendum)
Octopus nanus Adam, 1973
Octopus niveus Lesson, 1831 (taxon inquirendum)
Octopus occidentalis Steenstrup in Hoyle, 1885
Octopus ochotensis Sasaki, 1920 (taxon inquirendum)
Octopus oculifer Hoyle, 1904 – Galapagos reef octopus
Octopus oliveri Berry, 1914
Octopus oshimai  Sasaki, 1929 (taxon inquirendum)
Octopus pallidus Hoyle, 1885 – pale octopus
Octopus parvus Sasaki, 1917 – Japanese pygmy octopus
Octopus penicillifer Berry, 1954
Octopus pentherinus Rochebrune & Mabille, 1889 ('nomen dubium)Octopus prashadi Adam, 1939 (taxon inquirendum)Octopus pricei * Berry, 1913 (taxon inquirendum)Octopus pumilus Norman & Sweeney, 1997Octopus pyrum Norman, Hochberg & Lu, 1997Octopus rubescens Berry, 1953 – East Pacific red octopusOctopus salutii  Vérany, 1836 – spider octopusOctopus sanctaehelenae Robson, 1929Octopus sasakii Taki, 1942 (taxon inquirendum)Octopus selene Voss, 1971 – moon octopusOctopus sinensis d'Orbigny, 1841 - East Asian Common octopus
 Octopus stictochrus Voss, 1971Octopus spinosus Sasaki, 1920 (taxon inquirendum)Octopus superciliosus Quoy & Gaimard, 1832frilled pygmy octopusOctopus tehuelchus d'Orbigny, 1834 – Tehuelche or Patagonian octopusOctopus tenebricus Smith, 1884Octopus tetricus Gould, 1852 – gloomy octopus or common Sydney octopusOctopus tsugarensis Sasaki, 1920 (taxon inquirendum)Octopus validus Sasaki, 1920 (taxon inquirendum)Octopus veligero Berry, 1953 – veiled octopusOctopus verrucosus Hoyle, 1885Octopus vitiensis Hoyle, 1885 – bighead octopusOctopus vulgaris Cuvier, 1797 – common octopusOctopus warringa Stranks, 1990 – club pygmy octopusOctopus wolfi  Wülker, 1913 – star-sucker pygmy octopusOctopus yendoi Sasaki, 1920 (taxon inquirendum)Octopus zonatus Voss, 1968 – Atlantic banded octopus

The species listed above with an asterisk (*) are questionable and need further study to determine if they are valid species or synonyms.
 Species brought into synonymy

 Octopus abaculus Norman & Sweeney, 1997: synonym of Abdopus abaculus (Norman & Sweeney, 1997)
 Octopus aculeatus d'Orbigny, 1834: synonym of Abdopus aculeatus (d'Orbigny, 1834)Octopus adamsi]' Benham, 1944 : synonym of Octopus huttoni Benham, 1943
 Octopus aegina Gray, 1849: synonym of Amphioctopus aegina (Gray, 1849)
 Octopus albus Rafinesque, 1814: synonym of Octopus vulgaris Cuvier, 1797
 Octopus alderii Vérany, 1851: synonym of Callistoctopus macropus (Risso, 1826)
Octopus alpheus, Capricorn night octopus: synonym of Callistoctopus alpheus (Norman, 1993)
 Octopus alpheus Norman, 1993: synonym of Callistoctopus alpheus (Norman, 1993)
 Octopus americanus Froriep, 1806: synonym of Octopus vulgaris Cuvier, 1797
 Octopus apollyon (S. S. Berry, 1912): synonym of Enteroctopus dofleini (Wülker, 1910)
 Octopus arcticus Prosch, 1849: synonym of Bathypolypus arcticus (Prosch, 1849)
 Octopus areolatus de Haan, 1839: synonym of Amphioctopus fangsiao (d'Orbigny, 1839)
 Octopus aspilosomatis Norman, 1993, plain-body night octopus: synonym of Callistoctopus aspilosomatis (Norman, 1993)
 Octopus bairdii Verrill, 1873: synonym of Bathypolypus bairdii (Verrill, 1873)
 Octopus bakerii d'Orbigny, 1826: synonym of Octopus americanus Montfort, 1802: synonym of Octopus vulgaris Cuvier, 1797
 Octopus bermudensis Hoyle, 1885: synonym of Callistoctopus furvus (Gould, 1852)
 Octopus bitentaculatus Risso, 1854: synonym of Octopus vulgaris Cuvier, 1797
 Octopus brevitentaculatus Blainville, 1826: synonym of Octopus vulgaris Cuvier, 1797
 Octopus brocki Ortmann, 1888: synonym of Amphioctopus fangsiao (d'Orbigny, 1839)
 Octopus bunurong Stranks, 1990: synonym of Callistoctopus bunurong (Stranks, 1990) – southern white-spot octopus 
 Octopus burryi Voss, 1950: synonym of Amphioctopus burryi (Voss, 1950)
 Octopus carolinensis Verrill, 1884:  synonym of Amphioctopus carolinensis (Verrill, 1884), Carolinian octopus 
 Octopus cassiopea Gray, 1849: synonym of Octopus vulgaris Cuvier, 1797
 Octopus cassiopeia Gray, 1849 (incorrect subsequent spelling of specific epithet): synonym of Octopus vulgaris Cuvier, 1797
 Octopus catenulatus Philippi, 1844: synonym of Ocythoe tuberculata Rafinesque, 1814
 Octopus chromatus Heilprin, 1888: synonym of Callistoctopus furvus (Gould, 1852)
 Octopus cirrhosus Lamarck, 1798: synonym of Eledone cirrhosa (Lamarck, 1798)
 Octopus cocco Risso, 1854: synonym of Scaeurgus unicirrhus (Delle Chiaje [in de Férussac & d'Orbigny], 1841)
 Octopus cocco Vérany, 1846: synonym of Pteroctopus tetracirrhus (Delle Chiaje, 1830)
 Octopus coerulescentes Fra Piero, 1895: synonym of Octopus vulgaris Cuvier, 1797
 Octopus communis Park, 1885: synonym of Macroctopus maorum (Hutton, 1880)
 Octopus cuvieri d'Orbigny, 1826: synonym of Callistoctopus lechenaultii (d'Orbigny, 1826)
 Octopus dana Robson, 1929: synonym of Macrotritopus defilippi (Vérany, 1851)
 Octopus defilippi Vérany, 1851: synonym of Macrotritopus defilippi (Vérany, 1851) Atlantic longarm octopus or Lilliput longarm octopus 
 Octopus didynamus Rafinesque, 1814: synonym of Callistoctopus macropus (Risso, 1826)
 Octopus dierythraeus Norman, 1992: synonym of Callistoctopus dierythraeus (Norman, 1992) – red-spot night octopus 
 Octopus digueti Perrier & Rochebrune, 1894: synonym of Paroctopus digueti (Perrier & Rochebrune, 1894) – Diguet's pygmy octopus
 Octopus dofleini (Wülker, 1910): synonym of Enteroctopus dofleini (Wülker, 1910)
 Octopus dollfusi Robson, 1928: synonym of Amphioctopus aegina (Gray, 1849)
 Octopus duplex Hoyle, 1885: synonym of Octopus superciliosus Quoy & Gaimard, 1832
 Octopus equivocus Robson, 1929: synonym of Macrotritopus defilippi (Vérany, 1851)
 Octopus ergasticus P. Fischer & H. Fischer, 1892: synonym of Bathypolypus ergasticus (P. Fischer & H. Fischer, 1892)
 Octopus eudora Gray, 1849: synonym of Octopus americanus Montfort, 1802: synonym of Octopus vulgaris Cuvier, 1797
 Octopus exannulatus Norman, 1992: synonym of Amphioctopus exannulatus (Norman, 1992)
 Octopus fangsiao d'Orbigny, 1839: synonym of Amphioctopus fangsiao (d'Orbigny, 1839)
 Octopus fasciatus Hoyle, 1886: synonym of Hapalochlaena fasciata (Hoyle, 1886)
 Octopus fimbriatus d'Orbigny, 1841: synonym of Abdopus horridus (d'Orbigny, 1826)
 Octopus flindersi Cotton, 1932: synonym of Macroctopus maorum (Hutton, 1880)
 Octopus fontanianus d'Orbigny, 1834: synonym of Robsonella fontaniana (d'Orbigny, 1834)
 Octopus frayedus Rafinesque, 1814: synonym of Callistoctopus macropus (Risso, 1826)
 Octopus furvus Gould, 1852: synonym of Callistoctopus furvus (Gould, 1852)
 Octopus geryonea Gray, 1849: synonym of Octopus americanus Montfort, 1802: synonym of Octopus vulgaris Cuvier, 1797
 Octopus gibbsi O'Shea, 1999:  synonym of Octopus tetricus Gould, 1852
 Octopus gilbertianus Berry, 1912: synonym of Enteroctopus dofleini (Wülker, 1910)
 Octopus glaber Wülker, 1920: synonym of Octopus cyanea Gray, 1849
 Octopus gracilis Verrill, 1884: synonym of Macrotritopus equivocus (Robson, 1929)
 Octopus gracilis Eydoux & Souleyet, 1852: synonym of Tremoctopus gracilis (Eydoux & Souleyet, 1852)
 Octopus granosus Blainville, 1826: synonym of Callistoctopus macropus (Risso, 1826)
 Octopus granulatus Lamarck, 1799: synonym of Amphioctopus granulatus (Lamarck, 1799)
 Octopus graptus Norman, 1992: synonym of Callistoctopus graptus (Norman, 1992) – scribbled night octopus
 Octopus groenlandicus Steenstrup, 1856: synonym of Bathypolypus arcticus (Prosch, 1849)
 Octopus guangdongensis Dong, 1976: synonym of Abdopus guangdongensis (Dong, 1976)
 Octopus hardwickei Gray, 1849: synonym of Amphioctopus aegina (Gray, 1849)
 Octopus harmandi Rochebrune, 1882: synonym of Abdopus aculeatus (d'Orbigny, 1834)
 Octopus herdmani Hoyle, 1904: synonym of Octopus cyanea Gray, 1849
 Octopus heteropus Rafinesque, 1814: synonym of Octopus vulgaris Cuvier, 1797
 Octopus horridus d'Orbigny, 1826: synonym of Abdopus horridus (d'Orbigny, 1826)
 Octopus horsti Joubin, 1898: synonym of Octopus cyanea Gray, 1849
 Octopus hoylei (S. S. Berry, 1909): synonym of Pteroctopus hoylei (S. S. Berry, 1909)
 Octopus indicus Rapp, 1835: synonym of Cistopus indicus (Rapp, 1835)
 Octopus januarii Hoyle, 1885: synonym of Muusoctopus januarii (Hoyle, 1885)
 Octopus kagoshimensis Ortmann, 1888: synonym of Amphioctopus kagoshimensis (Ortmann, 1888)
 Octopus kempi Robson, 1929: synonym of Macrotritopus defilippi (Vérany, 1851)
 Octopus kermadecensis (Berry, 1914): synonym of Callistoctopus kermadecensis (Berry, 1914)
 Octopus koellikeri Vérany, 1851: synonym of Tremoctopus violaceus delle Chiaje, 1830
 Octopus lechenaultii d'Orbigny, 1826: synonym of Callistoctopus lechenaultii (d'Orbigny, 1826)
 Octopus leioderma (Berry, 1911): synonym of Benthoctopus leioderma (Berry, 1911)
 Octopus lentus Verrill, 1880: synonym of Bathypolypus bairdii (Verrill, 1873)
 Octopus leschenaultii d'Orbigny, 1826: synonym of Callistoctopus macropus (Risso, 1826)
 Octopus leucoderma San Giovanni, 1829: synonym of Eledone leucoderma (San Giovanni, 1829)
 Octopus lobensis Castellanos & Menni, 1969: synonym of Octopus tehuelchus d'Orbigny, 1834 –  lobed octopus 
 Octopus lothei Chun, 1913: synonym of Bathypolypus ergasticus (P. Fischer & H. Fischer, 1892)
 Octopus lunulatus Quoy & Gaimard, 1832: synonym of Hapalochlaena lunulata (Quoy & Gaimard, 1832)
 Octopus luteus (Sasaki, 1929): synonym of Callistoctopus luteus (Sasaki, 1929) – starry night octopus
 Octopus macropodus Sangiovanni, 1829: synonym of Callistoctopus macropus (Risso, 1826)
 Octopus macropus Risso, 1826: synonym of Callistoctopus macropus (Risso, 1826) –  Atlantic white-spotted octopus
 Octopus maculatus Rafinesque, 1814: synonym of Octopus vulgaris Cuvier, 1797
 Octopus maculosus Hoyle, 1883: synonym of Hapalochlaena maculosa (Hoyle, 1883)
 Octopus magnificus Villanueva, Sanchez & Compagno, 1992: synonym of Enteroctopus magnificus (Villanueva, Sanchez & Compagno, 1992)
 Octopus maorum Hutton, 1880: synonym of Macroctopus maorum (Hutton, 1880) – Maori octopus
 Octopus marginatus Taki, 1964: synonym of Amphioctopus marginatus (Iw. Taki, 1964)
 Octopus marmoratus Hoyle, 1885: synonym of Octopus cyanea Gray, 1849
 Octopus membranaceus Quoy & Gaimard, 1832: synonym of Amphioctopus membranaceus (Quoy & Gaimard, 1832)
 Octopus microstomus Reynaud, 1830: synonym of Tremoctopus violaceus delle Chiaje, 1830
 Octopus moschatus Rafinesque, 1814: synonym of Octopus vulgaris Cuvier, 1797
 Octopus moschatus Lamarck, 1798: synonym of Eledone moschata (Lamarck, 1798)
 Octopus mototi Norman, 1992: synonym of Amphioctopus mototi (Norman, 1992)
 Octopus neglectus Nateewathana & Norman, 1999: synonym of Amphioctopus neglectus (Nateewathana & Norman, 1999)
 Octopus nierstraszi W. Adam, 1938: synonym of Hapalochlaena nierstraszi (W. Adam, 1938)
 Octopus nierstrazi [sic]: synonym of Octopus nierstraszi W. Adam, 1938: synonym of Hapalochlaena nierstraszi (W. Adam, 1938)
 Octopus niger Risso, 1854: synonym of Octopus vulgaris Cuvier, 1797
 Octopus niger Rafinesque, 1814: synonym of Octopus vulgaris Cuvier, 1797
 Octopus nocturnus Norman & Sweeney, 1997: synonym of Callistoctopus nocturnus (Norman & Sweeney, 1997)
 Octopus obesus Verrill, 1880: synonym of Bathypolypus bairdii (Verrill, 1873)
 Octopus ocellatus Gray, 1849: synonym of Amphioctopus fangsiao (d'Orbigny, 1839)
 Octopus octopodia Tryon, 1879: synonym of Octopus vulgaris Cuvier, 1797
 Octopus ornatus Gould, 1852: synonym of Callistoctopus ornatus (Gould, 1852) – ornate octopus or white-striped octopus
 Octopus ovulum Sasaki, 191: synonym of Amphioctopus ovulum (Sasaki, 1917)
 Octopus rapanui Voss, 1979: synonym of Callistoctopus rapanui (Voss, 1979)
 Octopus patagonicus Lönnberg, 1898: synonym of Enteroctopus megalocyathus (Gould, 1852)
 Octopus pictus Brock, 1882: synonym of Hapalochlaena fasciata (Hoyle, 1886)
 Octopus pictus Verrill, 1883: synonym of Octopus verrilli Hoyle, 1886
 Octopus pilosus Risso, 1826: synonym of Octopus vulgaris Cuvier, 1797
 Octopus piscatorum Verrill, 1879: synonym of Bathypolypus bairdii (Verrill, 1873)
 Octopus polyzenia Gray, 1849: synonym of Amphioctopus polyzenia (Gray, 1849)
 Octopus punctatus Gabb, 1862: synonym of Enteroctopus dofleini (Wülker, 1910)
 Octopus pustulosus Sasaki, 1920: synonym of Octopus madokai Berry, 1921
 Octopus rabassin Risso, 1854: synonym of Octopus vulgaris Cuvier, 1797
 Octopus reticularis Petangna, 1828: synonym of Ocythoe tuberculata Rafinesque, 1814
 Octopus rex Nateewathana & Norman, 1999: synonym of Amphioctopus rex (Nateewathana & Norman, 1999)
 Octopus robsoni Adam, 1941: synonym of Amphioctopus robsoni (Adam, 1941)
 Octopus robustus Brock, 1887: synonym of Hapalochlaena fasciata (Hoyle, 1886)
 Octopus roosevelti]'  Stuart, 1941: synonym of Octopus oculifer Hoyle, 1904
 Octopus ruber Rafinesque, 1814: synonym of Octopus vulgaris Cuvier, 1797
 Octopus rufus Risso, 1854: synonym of Scaeurgus unicirrhus (Delle Chiaje [in de Férussac & d'Orbigny], 1841)
 Octopus salebrosus Sasaki, 1920: synonym of Sasakiopus salebrosus (Sasaki, 1920)
 Octopus saluzzii Naef, 1923: synonym of Octopus salutii Vérany, 1836
 Octopus saluzzii Vérany, 1840: synonym of Octopus salutii Vérany, 1836
 Octopus scorpio (Berry, 1920): synonym of Macrotritopus defilippi (Vérany, 1851)
 Octopus semipalmatus Owen, 1836: synonym of Tremoctopus violaceus delle Chiaje, 1830
 Octopus siamensis Nateewathana & Norman, 1999: synonym of Amphioctopus siamensis (Nateewathana & Norman, 1999)
 Octopus smedleyi Robson, 1932: synonym of Amphioctopus aegina (Gray, 1849)
 Octopus sponsalis Fischer & Fischer, 1892: synonym of Bathypolypus sponsalis (P. Fischer & H. Fischer, 1892)
 Octopus striolatus Dong, 1976: synonym of Amphioctopus marginatus (Iw. Taki, 1964)
 Octopus taprobanensis  Robson, 1926: synonym of Callistoctopus taprobanensis (Robson, 1926)
 Octopus tenuicirrus Sasaki, 1929: synonym of Octopus hongkongensis Hoyle, 1885
 Octopus tetracirrhus Delle Chiaje, 1830: synonym of Pteroctopus tetracirrhus (Delle Chiaje, 1830)
 Octopus tetradynamus Rafinesque, 1814: synonym of Octopus vulgaris Cuvier, 1797
 Octopus titanotus Troschel, 1857: synonym of Pteroctopus tetracirrhus (Delle Chiaje, 1830)
 Octopus tonganus Hoyle, 1885: synonym of Abdopus tonganus (Hoyle, 1885)
 Octopus tritentaculatus Risso, 1854: synonym of Octopus vulgaris Cuvier, 1797
 Octopus troscheli Targioni-Tozzetti, 1869: synonym of Octopus vulgaris Cuvier, 1797
 Octopus troschelii Targioni-Tozzetti, 1869: synonym of Octopus vulgaris Cuvier, 1797
 Octopus tuberculatus Risso, 1854: synonym of Ocythoe tuberculata Rafinesque, 1814
 Octopus tuberculatus Targioni-Tozzetti, 1869: synonym of Octopus vulgaris Cuvier, 1797
 Octopus tuberculatus de Blainville, 1826: synonym of Octopus vulgaris Cuvier, 1797
 Octopus unicirrhus Delle Chiaje [in de Férussac & d'Orbigny], 1841: synonym of Scaeurgus unicirrhus (Delle Chiaje [in de Férussac & d'Orbigny], 1841)
 Octopus varunae Oommen, 1971: synonym of Amphioctopus varunae (Oommen, 1971)
 Octopus velatus Rang, 1837: synonym of Tremoctopus violaceus delle Chiaje, 1830
 Octopus velifer de Férussac, 1835: synonym of Tremoctopus violaceus delle Chiaje, 1830
 Octopus veranyi Wagner, 1829: synonym of Ocythoe tuberculata Rafinesque, 1814
 Octopus vincenti Pickford, 1955: synonym of Amphioctopus burryi (Voss, 1950)
 Octopus violaceus Risso, 1854: synonym of Ocythoe tuberculata Rafinesque, 1814
 Octopus westerniensis d'Orbigny, 1834: synonym of Octopus superciliosus Quoy & Gaimard, 1832
 Octopus winckworthi Robson, 1926: synonym of Macrochlaena winckworthi'' (Robson, 1926)

References

External links

Tree of Life website gives information about the classification of cephalopod groups

Octopodidae
Cephalopod genera
Taxa named by Georges Cuvier